Armelle Deutsch (born 22 February 1979) is a French actress.  Armelle was born in the Bouches-du-Rhône. 

At the age of 13, Deutsch started acting classes and joined her first theatre group within Le Théâtre d'Astroméla. She then, plays a few plays, directed by Akel Akian in Marseille. At the age of 18, she decides to finish her acting training in Paris and enrolls at the famous Cours Florent. She then conducts the auditions in the hopes of landing a role on the big screen.

One of her first appearances that made her known was in Francis Veber's comedy Le Placard, in which she plays Michèle Laroque. 

Following the success of the movie, Armelle increases her appearances and becomes a well-known actress in France. Since, she has appeared in more than sixty films since 2000.

Private life 
Armelle met actor Thomas Jouannet, a Swiss actor on the set of the TV drama "L'Affaire Dominici" in 2003. The two actors fall in love at first sight and never leave each other. On June 26, 2010, they got married. They have two kids. 

The pair lives in a quiet village in Loir-et-Cher.

Selected filmography
She made her first appearances in 2000 with a few small television roles - Vérité oblige, Navarro, One and one make six, Le Grand Patron. In the year 2001, she stood out in the role of Michèle Laroque's secretary in Francis Veber's successful comedy, Le Placard (2001). The same year, she played in the comedy La Boîte, directed by Claude Zidi.  

In 2003, she played a small role in the comedy-drama "Laisse tes mains sur mes hanches" , directed by Chantal Lauby, and made an appearance in Francis Veber's new film, "Tais-toi !.  

In 2004, she played roles in "Nos Amis les flics", by Bob Swaim, and "Le Carton", by Charles Nemes. She, then, lands a TV role in a detective series, playing Élodie Bradford, a French television series with 5 90 minutes- episodes, created by Lionel Bailliu and broadcast between October 20, 2004, and February 9, 2007, on M6. At the same time, she plays roles in comedies; in 2007, "Fracassés", by Franck Llopis, "La différence, c'est que c'est pas pareil", by Pascal Laëthier, and "Aime-Moi" (Short Film), by David Courtil. 

Below is the list of some of her movies and appearances, based on the popularity and general influence.

References

External links 

1979 births
Living people
French film actresses
People from Martigues